Chirine Lamti (born 13 September 1994) is a footballer who played as a midfielder for Slavia Prague. Born in Denmark, she represents Tunisia at international level

Club career

Slavia Prague
In July 2021, Lamti joined Slavia Prague.

International career
Lamti, who has dual Danish nationality, made her debut for the Tunisia national team on 10 June 2021, playing the full match against Jordan.

International goals
Scores and results list Tunisia's goal tally first

See also
List of Tunisia women's international footballers

References

External links

1994 births
Living people
Citizens of Tunisia through descent
Tunisian women's footballers
Women's association football midfielders
Tunisia women's international footballers
Footballers from Copenhagen
Danish women's footballers
Brøndby IF (women) players
Danish people of Tunisian descent
SK Slavia Praha (women) players
Expatriate women's footballers in the Czech Republic
Czech Women's First League players
Tunisian expatriate footballers
Danish expatriate women's footballers
Danish expatriate sportspeople in the Czech Republic
Tunisian expatriate sportspeople in the Czech Republic